The national interest is a sovereign state's goals and ambitions (economic, military, cultural, or otherwise), taken to be the aim of government.

Etymology
The Italian phrase ragione degli stati was first used by Giovanni della Casa around the year 1547.

The expression "reason of state" (Ragion di Stato) was championed by Italian diplomat and political thinker Niccolò Machiavelli, and was later popularised by Italian political thinker Giovanni Botero around 1580s,. Prominently, Chief Minister Cardinal Richelieu justified France's intervention on the Protestant side, despite its own Catholicism, in the Thirty Years' War as being in the national interest in order to block the increasing power of the Catholic Holy Roman Emperor. At Richelieu's prompting, Jean de Silhon defended the concept of raison d'État as "a mean between what conscience permits and affairs require."

Usage
Within the field of international relations, the national interest has frequently been assumed to comprise the pursuit of power, security and wealth. Neorealist and liberal institutionalist scholars tend to define the national interest as revolving around security and power. Liberal scholars see national interests as an aggregation of the preferences of domestic political groups. Constructivist scholars reject that the national interest of states are static and can be assumed a priori; rather, they argue that the preferences of states are shaped through social interactions and are changeable.

See also
 Common good
 Nation state
 Public interest
 Realpolitik
 Pragmatism
 Realism (international relations)
 Moral nihilism

References

Further reading
 Beard, Charles A. 1934. The Idea of National Interest. Macmillan.
 Burchill, Scott. 2005. The National Interest in International Relations Theory. Palgrave Macmillan.
 Frankel, Joseph. 1970. National Interest. London: Pall Mall.
 Hu, Shaohua. 2016. "A Framework for analysis of national interest: United States policy toward Taiwan." Contemporary Security Policy 37(1):144–167.
Nuechterlein, Donald. 1976. "National interests and foreign policy: A conceptual framework for analysis and decision-making." British Journal of International Studies 2(3): 246–266.
 Rosenau, James. 1968. "National Interest." pp. 34–40 in International Encyclopedia of the Social Sciences 2(1), edited by D. L. Sills and R. K. Merton. New York: Macmillan/Free Press.
 Troianiello, Antonino. 1999. Raison d’État et droit public, Thesis paper, Université du Havre, 748 pages.

Political realism
International relations
State ideologies